William Wallace Brooks 'Bill' Lloyd (1934–2011) was an Australian rugby league footballer.

Born in Darlinghurst, New South Wales, Lloyd played his junior football with Collaroy Surf Club and
Narrabeen Junior Rugby League Club before making his New South Wales Rugby Football League premiership debut for Manly-Warringah club in 1955.

Lloyd retired from rugby league in 1960 after 87 games with Manly.

References

1934 births
Australian rugby league players
Manly Warringah Sea Eagles players
Living people
Rugby league players from Sydney